Lodi is an underground station of Line C of the Rome Metro.

It served as the western terminus of Line C since its opening, on June 29, 2015, until May 12, 2018, when the terminus moved to San Giovanni.

The station is not exactly located in Piazza Lodi, after which it is named, but further west in Via La Spezia, between Via Orvieto and Piazza Camerino. Works started in 2007 and were finished in January 2015. The station opened on 29 June 2015.

External links

References

Rome Metro Line C stations
Railway stations opened in 2015
2015 establishments in Italy
Rome Q. VIII Tuscolano
Railway stations in Italy opened in the 21st century